Tatev Abrahamyan (born January 13, 1988) is an Armenian-American chess player. She currently holds the title of Woman Grandmaster (WGM).

Career 
Abrahamyan finished in a tie for first place with Nana Dzagnidze and Varvara Kirillova in the Girls U12 section of the 1999 European Youth Chess Championships, and took the bronze medal on tiebreak. She tied for first in the 2005 U.S. Women's Chess Championship and lost the playoff match to Rusudan Goletiani. In 2006, Abrahamyan won the Girls Under 18 section of the Pan American Youth Chess Festival, held in Cuenca, Ecuador, with a perfect score of 9/9 points. In 2008 Abrahamyan won the Goddess Chess Award for her uncompromising play. She tied for second place with Anna Zatonskih in the 2010 U.S. Women's Championship, behind the winner Irina Krush who achieved a score of 8/9, and took second again in 2011 after drawing with Zatonskih in an "Armageddon" tiebreak game. She competed in the Women's World Chess Championship in 2012 and 2015.

In team competitions, Abrahamyan has represented the United States in the Women's Chess Olympiad and in the Women's World Team Chess Championship.

She moved from Armenia to the United States in 2001. Abrahamyan lives in Glendale, California. She studied at Clark Magnet High School at La Crescenta. She graduated in 2011 from California State University, Long Beach, double majoring in psychology and political science.

References

External links
 
 
 
 
 Grandmaster Games Database - Tatev Abrahamyan
 Armeniapedia

1988 births
Living people
Chess woman grandmasters
Armenian female chess players
American female chess players
Sportspeople from Yerevan
Sportspeople from Glendale, California
Armenian emigrants to the United States
Armenian American
21st-century American women